INSYS was a leading British defence contractor, located in Ampthill, Bedfordshire, supplying integrated system solutions to the UK and allied armed forces directly or through global prime contractors.  It was formed in October 2001 by a management buy-out of Hunting Engineering and was subsequently acquired by Lockheed Martin UK Holdings, Ltd., a subsidiary of Lockheed Martin Corporation in October 2005.

INSYS's products included lightweight anti-tank weapons such as the LAW 80 or the BL755 cluster bombs. As part of Lockheed Martin UK it undertakes the certification and supply of the WAH-64 Apache helicopter munitions. Support equipment includes the in-service and future Biological Detection Systems,  field hospitals, power generation and supply.

References

External links
 Lockheed Martin UK

British companies established in 2001
Companies based in Bedfordshire
Defence companies of the United Kingdom
Science and technology in Bedfordshire